The Goya Award for Best Documentary (Spanish: Premio Goya a la mejor película documental) is one of the Goya Awards, Spain's principal national film awards. The category was first presented at the sixteenth edition with José Luis Guerín's En construcción being the first winner.

The film Balseros received a nomination for the Academy Award for Best Documentary Feature at the 76th Academy Awards with The Silence of Others (2018) made the shortlist for the same category at the 91st Academy Awards. At the European Film Awards, the films The Basque Ball: Skin Against Stone (2003), Fados (2007) and The Silence of Others (2018) received a nomination for Best Documentary.

Winners and nominees

2000s

2010s

2020s

Notes

References

External links
Official site
IMDb: Goya Awards

Documentary films